= Basirat Nahibi =

Nigerian politician

- Other name: Basirat Nahibi-Niasse
- Citizenship: Nigeria
- Occupations: Politician, entrepreneur
- Organization(s): Women Advancement for Economic and Leadership in Africa (WAELE)
- Political party: All Progressives Congress

Basirat Nahibi or Basirat Nahibi-Niasse is a Nigerian politician, entrepreneur and the first female gubernatorial aspirant in Nigeria.

She is the founder of Women Advancement for Economic and Leadership in Africa (WAELE); a non-profit focused on empowering African women, economically and politically as well as ensuring their participation in peace and conflict transformation across 52 countries on the continent. She is also a founding member of the All Progressives Congress.
